Emamzadeh Jafar Rural District is a rural district (dehestan) in the Central District of Gachsaran County, Kohgiluyeh and Boyer-Ahmad Province, Iran. At the 2006 census, its population was 12,817, in 2,792 families. The rural district has 48 villages.

References 

Rural Districts of Kohgiluyeh and Boyer-Ahmad Province
Gachsaran County